Sky News Today is a live news programme on Sky News which usually runs between 11:00 am and 2:00 pm on weekdays. The programme was presented by two anchors, however following on from the social distancing measures due to COVID-19, and the departure of Colin Brazier from Sky News, the programme is now solo anchored. Jayne Secker is the main presenter of the programme from Monday to Thursday with Samantha Washington usually presenting the Friday edition.

Overview
Sky News Today was launched in September 2002, presented by Martin Stanford and Julie Etchingham, broadcast on weekdays between 10:00 am and 1:00 pm. In contrast to the rest of Sky News' coverage at that time, Sky News Today was largely presented from the heart of the newsroom, with frequent use being made of a large videowall at the back of the newsroom.

When Sky News underwent a major relaunch in October 2005, Sky News Today relaunched with it; it was brought forward an hour, now running from 9 am to 12 pm, and an afternoon edition was introduced, from 2 pm until 5 pm. The programme was now also presented by three presenters at a time: the morning edition by Martin Stanford, Anna Botting and former BBC News presenter Anna Jones, and the afternoon edition by Mark Longhurst, Stephen Dixon and new signing Ginny Buckley. The three-presenter format was axed in early 2006, with the strand returning to a more traditional two-presenter format.

In October 2007, Sky made the move to single headed presentation with Julie Etchingham becoming the anchor of Sky News Today between 9 am and 1 pm on weekdays; news summaries were presented by Colin Brazier.

From Tuesday 8 January 2008, former BBC Breakfast anchor Dermot Murnaghan replaced Julie Etchingham as main presenter of the show. Etchingham moved to ITV News to present the relaunched News at Ten with Sir Trevor McDonald. Likewise Emma Crosby took over the news summaries from Colin Brazier who moved to Afternoon Live to work alongside Kay Burley. However, shortly after taking up the headline post, Crosby moved to Sky's business news department, and then onto GMTV.

In February 2009, Sky News Today was reduced by one hour, broadcasting from 10 am to 1 pm (once again since October 2005), with The Live Desk running from 9 am to 10 am.

From January 2011, the strand started airing on Saturdays, and no longer featured a news summary presenter. Dermot now presented Monday to Wednesday with Colin Brazier presenting from Thursday - Saturday.

In September 2014, as part of a schedule revamp at Sky News, double-headed presentation was reinstated; a new strand running from 9 am to 12 pm weekdays was launched, presented by Colin Brazier and Jayne Secker. Dermot Murnaghan now presents a lunchtime slot from Monday to Wednesday.

From 26 September 2016, the slot moved to start at 11 am, as part of a new schedule; from 24 October, it was extended to 4 hours, finishing at 3 pm.

During the summer of 2017, the programme had a different format. Seeing as All Out Politics was on a summer break, one presenter presented from 10 to 12, it was double headed from 12–1, and then the presenter who started at noon took over from 1–3.

From April 2019, on Mondays to Thursdays the programme runs from 11 am until 1:30 pm, with Ian King Live following from 1:30 pm until 2 pm. On Fridays, the programme runs from 11 am until 2 pm as there is no Ian King Live.

In September 2020, the timings changed once more with the show airing from 12:00 pm until 2:00 pm. On Wednesdays however the show typically airs from 1:00 pm to 2:00 pm allowing an extended All Out Politics to cover Prime Minister's Questions. On occasion, the show airs an hour earlier from 11 am if All Out Politics isn't on air, such as during parliamentary recess.

In February 2021, it was announced that Colin Brazier was to leave Sky News Today to join GB News, a new television news channel due to launch in the UK.

Following Adam Boulton’s departure from Sky News, as of January 2022, Sky News Today now airs from 11 am each day and runs for 3 hours. During some holiday periods, the programme airs from 10 am - replacing Ian King Live - and aiding for four hours.

Presenters

Current presenters

Presenter history

Morning edition

Afternoon edition

References

2002 British television series debuts
2010s British television series
2020s British television series
Sky News
Sky UK original programming
English-language television shows
Sky television news shows